Downer Glacier is a 2.6-mile-long (4.2 km) glacier in the U.S. state of Alaska. It was named in 1910 by Lawrence Martin for the Milwaukee-Downer College for Women in Milwaukee, Wisconsin.

See also
 List of glaciers

References

Glaciers of Alaska
Glaciers of Chugach Census Area, Alaska
Glaciers of Unorganized Borough, Alaska
Milwaukee-Downer College